Angered is a borough of Gothenburg Municipality in Västra Götaland County, Sweden. Angered is the biggest Million Programme area in Gothenburg, and one of the biggest in the country, with 60,000 inhabitants.

Transportation 
Angered is served by bus lines 40 and 71-77 and a number of tram lines. The tram service terminates here, with the turning slope running around the bus terminal. The tram lines serving Angered are 4, 8 and 9 (towards Mölndal, Frölunda and Kungssten). Initially, the tram line was due to run past Angered Centrum, terminating at Rannebergen, not far from the centre. This project was abandoned while under construction, and bus line 76 runs from Angered Centrum to Rannebergen instead. However, there is space for trams inside the hill, just as at Hammarkullen. The next station southwards is Storås.

Sports 
The following sports clubs are located in Angered:

 Göteborg HC (GHC) of the Swedish Women's Hockey League (SDHL; premier women's ice hockey league in Sweden)
 Gunnilse IS of Division 3 (fifth-tier men's football league)
 Lärje-Angereds IF of Division 2 (fourth-tier men's football league)
 Rannebergens IF of Division 4 (sixth-tier men's football league)

Notable residents 
 Dead by April, metal band 
 Jens Lekman, indie singer-songwriter
 Christian Olsson, triple-jumper, former European no. 1, born in northern Angered
 Laleh Pourkarim, pop singer and actress, grew up in Angered

References 

Gothenburg
Housing in Sweden
Modernist architecture in Sweden
Residential buildings completed in the 20th century

no:Angered
nn:Angered